Hugues Delorme (10 April 1868 – 20 May 1942) was a French poet, comedian, playwright and journalist.

Life

Hugues Delorme was born on 10 April 1868 at Avize in the department of Marne with the name of Georges Thiebost.
He first lived in Rouen where he worked as a journalist for several years before moving to Paris. 
From 1896 he frequented the cabarets of Montmartre and became a poet, humorist, playwright and actor. 
He was well known at Le Chat Noir cabaret.
He joined Gardénia, a theatrical and artistic circle founded by Paul Fabre.

Hugues Delorme was very tall and slender, and was nicknamed La Voltige.
He participated with Paul Delmet, Gaston Montoya, Jacques Ferny and Marcel Legay in creating popular or sentimental songs that were mainly sung in the cabarets of Montmartre.
Delorme was an editor of the journal Le Courrier français.
He wrote two books about cartoonists, one about Georges Goursat (Sem) and the other about Carlègle (pseudonym of Charles Émile Egli).
These two books were published in Paris in 1939.

Delorme also wrote numerous plays, one-act pieces, reviews and some comedies and novels.
He works were performed at neighborhood theaters and at café-concerts such as Le Coup de minuit.
During his lifetime, he was best known for his classical poetry in octosyllables.
His poetry was widely published in various periodicals, but hardly any of it was published in collections.

Delorme died on 20 May 1942 and lies in the 89th division of the Père Lachaise Cemetery. His tomb is decorated with the inscription:

Works
 1889  Pierrot Amoureux
 1891  Pierrot financier 
 1894  La Mort d’Orphée 
 1900  La Marchande de pommes 
 1903  Mille regrets! cowritten with Francis Gally
 1907  L'Homme rouge et la femme verte, cowritten with Armand Nunès
 1907 Le Maître à aimer, cowritten with  Pierre Veber 
 1907 Zénaïde ou les caprices du destin
 1912 Revue de l'Olympia, interpreted by Yvonne Printemps 
 1913 Et patati et patata, cowritten with  Georges Nanteuil, interpreted by Yvonne Printemps 
 1914 La Fille de Figaro, cowritten with  Maurice Hennequin, music Xavier Leroux, with Jane Marnac
 1921 Chanson d'amour (Song of Love), adapted with Léon Abric from Das Dreimäderlhaus (7 May 1921) 
 1926 Divin Mensonge, operetta in 3 acts and 6 tableaux by Josef Szulc, cowritten with  Alex Madis and Pierre Veber
 1926 Le Temps d'aimer operetta in 3 acts by Henri Duvernois and Pierre Wolff, couplets by Hugues Delorme, music Reynaldo Hahn, Théâtre de la Michodière, 7 November 1926

References
Citations

Sources

External links

Catulle Mendès-France, "Le mouvement poétique française de 1867 à 1900", éditions Ministère de l'éducation nationale, Paris : 1903
Biographie succincte de Hugues Delorme
Hugues Delorme et l'esprit montmartrois

1868 births
1942 deaths
19th-century French dramatists and playwrights
20th-century French dramatists and playwrights
French poets
French journalists
French humorists